Waiting for Tomorrow may refer to:
"Waiting for Tomorrow" (2011), song by Mandisa from What If We Were Real
"Waiting for Tomorrow" (Martin Garrix and Pierce Fulton song), 2018 song from the album Bylaw
"Waiting for Tomorrow" (2021), album by Dr.Schafausen Djent